General elections were held in Swaziland on 19 and 20 April 1967 to elect members of the House of Assembly. The result was a second successive victory for the royalist Imbokodvo National Movement, which won 79.4% of the vote and all 24 seats.

Electoral system
Unlike the previous election in which there were two voter rolls for black and white voters, the election was held with a single voter roll, with each voter having three votes.

Results

References

Swaziland
Elections in Eswatini
Election